The men's +110 kg weightlifting event was the heaviest event at the weightlifting competition of the 1988 Summer Olympics, with competitors required to have a minimum of 110 kilograms of body mass. The competition took place on 29 September, and participants were divided in two groups.

Each lifter performed in both the snatch and clean and jerk lifts, with the final score being the sum of the lifter's best result in each. The athlete received three attempts in each of the two lifts, with the score for the lift being the heaviest weight successfully lifted.

Results 

Note: INJ — Injured

References

Sources

Weightlifting at the 1988 Summer Olympics